A kidult is an adult with childish interests.

Kidult may also refer to:

 Kidult, a 2007 album by Louis Cheung
 "Kidult", a track by His Electro Blue Voice from the Sub Pop 1000 alternative rock album
 "Kidult", a title by Yoon Doo-joon
 "Kidult", a 2020 song by Seventeen from the album Heng:garæ

See also
 Kidulthood, a 2006 British film